Eric Dosantos (born 25 February 1995) is an Uruguayan rugby union player, currently playing for Súper Liga Americana de Rugby side Peñarol. His preferred position is flanker.

Professional career
Dosantos signed for Súper Liga Americana de Rugby side Peñarol ahead of the 2021 Súper Liga Americana de Rugby season. He has also represented the Uruguay national team.

References

External links
itsrugby.co.uk Profile

1995 births
Living people
Uruguayan rugby union players
Rugby union flankers
Peñarol Rugby players
Uruguay international rugby union players
Rugby union locks